Jean René Akono (born ) is a Cameroonian male volleyball player and coach. He was part of the Cameroon men's national volleyball team in over 100 games, including its 1989 victory at the African Championship. He played for Amacam in his club career.

Akono later became coach of the Cameroon women's national volleyball team. He coached the women's team at the 2016 Summer Olympics.

Clubs
 Amacam (1990)

References

External links

1967 births
Living people
Cameroonian volleyball coaches
Cameroonian men's volleyball players
Place of birth missing (living people)